Caryocolum afghanum is a moth of the family Gelechiidae. It is found in Afghanistan.

The length of the forewings is 5-5.5 mm for males and 4.5–5 mm for females. The forewings are black mottled with white. There are white markings mixed with fuscous. Adults have been recorded on wing from mid-June to early August.

References

Moths described in 1988
afghanum
Moths of Asia